The 2012–13 Midland Football Alliance season was the 19th season of the Midland Football Alliance, a football league in England.

Clubs
The league featured 19 clubs from the previous season, along with three new clubs:

Continental Star, promoted from the Midland Football Combination
Gornal Athletic, promoted from the West Midlands (Regional) League
Stourport Swifts, relegated from the Southern Football League

From this league, only Boldmere St Michaels, Bridgnorth Town, Causeway United, Loughborough University, Stourport Swifts, Stratford Town and Westfields have applied for promotion.

League table

Results

References

External links
 Midland Football Alliance

2012-13
9